Corning Armory, since 1977 home to the Corning YMCA, is a historic National Guard armory building located at Corning in Steuben County, New York.  It was designed by architect William Haugaard. The historic, main block of the armory is a T-shaped Gothic Revival edifice with terra cotta trim constructed in 1934.  The front portion, the former administration building, is a two-story, seven-bay structure flanked by two one-and-a-half-story wings. The rear section is the former drill shed.

It was listed on the National Register of Historic Places in 2003.

References

Armories on the National Register of Historic Places in New York (state)
Government buildings completed in 1934
Buildings and structures in Steuben County, New York
Corning, New York
National Register of Historic Places in Steuben County, New York
1934 establishments in New York (state)
YMCA buildings in the United States